Olearia adenolasia, commonly known as woolly-glandular daisy-bush, is a species of flowering plant in the family Asteraceae. It is a small upright shrub with sticky leaves and blue-purple or white daisy flowers.

Description
Branches are glandular and have soft short silky hairs. The dark green upper surface of leaves has a silky texture with numerous short thickly matted glandular hairs. The leaf underside has non-glandular soft cream hairs, an obscure mid-vein and rolled edges. The single floret consists of 9-15 small flowers at the apex of a branch on a short stalk. The individual flowers have a yellow centre. Flowers from August to November.

Taxonomy and naming
This daisy bush was first formally described in 1865 by  Ferdinand von Mueller who gave it the name Aster adenolasius in Fragmenta phytographiae Australiae.  In 1867 George Bentham formalised the name Olearia adenolasia and the description was published in Flora Australiensis. The specific epithet (adenolasia) is derived from the Ancient Greek words aden meaning "gland" and lasios meaning "hairy", "woolly" or "shaggy".

Distribution and habitat
Woolly-glandular daisy-bush grows in Western Australia near Coolgardie, Esperance plains, Kondinin and Ravensthorpe in sandy loam, sand over laterite and on sand hills.

References

Eudicots of Western Australia
adenolasia
Taxa named by Ferdinand von Mueller
Taxa named by George Bentham